Henri Peslier (4 January 1880 – 12 May 1912) was a French Olympic water polo player.

See also
 List of Olympic medalists in water polo (men)

References

External links
 

1880 births
1912 deaths
French male water polo players
Olympic water polo players of France
Water polo players at the 1900 Summer Olympics
Olympic bronze medalists for France
Olympic medalists in water polo
Medalists at the 1900 Summer Olympics